Matt Matthews may refer to:

Matty Matthews, American boxer
Rudolph Matthews, American handball player

See also
Mat Mathews, Dutch accordionist